Lou Berney (born 1964) is an American crime fiction author who has published four books since 2010. For his works, Berney has won multiple awards including an Anthony, Barry and Edgar for The Long and Faraway Gone. With November Road, Berney won the CWA Ian Fleming Steel Dagger while also winning additional Barry and Edgar awards. Apart from writing, Berney was a screenwriter whose written film, Angels Sing, was released in 2012. Berney has also taught at the University of Oklahoma and Oklahoma City University during the 2010s.

Early life and education
Berney was born in Oklahoma City, Oklahoma in 1964. He was dismissed from several jobs as a teenager, which included
positions in photography and property maintenance. For his post-secondary education, Berney went to Loyola University New Orleans for a journalism program before he graduated with a Master of Fine Arts from the University of Massachusetts Amherst.

Career
In 1991, Berney released The Road to Bobby Joe and Other Stories. During the 1990s, Berney completed two unpublished books before he became a screenwriter. During the 2007–2008 Writers Guild of America strike, Berney took three months to write a screenplay called Gutshot Straight. Berney planned to turn Gutshot Straight into a movie before publishing his work as a book in 2010. His written film, Angels Sing, was released to theaters in 2013.

Following Gutshot Straight, Berney released Whiplash River in 2012 as a followup book for his Shake Bouchon series. His last Bouchon book, Double Barrel Bluff, was not released during the scheduled 2020 release. Outside of series, additional books published by Berney were The Long and Faraway Gone in 2015 and November Road in 2018. That year, November Road was planned for a movie adaptation when Lawrence Kasdan bought the book's film rights.

Apart from his works, Berney was a writing teacher throughout the 2000s. In 2011, Berney began teaching creative writing for Oklahoma City University. He continued to teach at Oklahoma City during the 2010s while also teaching with the University of Oklahoma.

Writing process and themes
At the beginning of his writing process, Berney focuses on creating on the backgrounds of the people he plans to write about. He then moves on toward the book's events. To create his books, Berney uses a laptop and types them out at a coffeehouse in Oklahoma City. For his two Shake Bouchon books, Berney chose Panama and Egypt as locations.

For The Long and Faraway Gone, Berney thought about using the Oklahoma City bombing before choosing different events that occurred in Oklahoma City. Berney based his book on murders that occurred at a Sirloin Stockade during the late 1970s and the disappearances of two children at the Oklahoma State Fair during the early 1980s. With November Road, Berney based his book on the conspiracy theory that the New Orleans crime family were behind the assassination of John F. Kennedy. Berney intended to have the main characters meet each other in a town before he decided to have them meet during their individual travels.

Nominations and awards
Before working in screenwriting, Paramount Pictures awarded Berney a fellowship. With Gutshot Straight, Berney was nominated for the 2011 Barry Award in the Best First Mystery/Crime Novel category. In 2013, Whiplash River received a nomination for the Best Paperback Original category as part of the Anthony Awards and Edgar Awards. With The Long and Faraway Gone, Berney was nominated for the Los Angeles Times Book Prize for Mystery/Thriller in 2016.

That year, Berney received the 2016 Macavity Award in the Best Mystery Novel category. In the Best Paperback Original categories for 2016, Berney also won the Anthony, Barry, and Edgar awards. The Long and Faraway Gone was on the longlist for the Dublin Literary Award in 2017.

For November Road, Berney received the Hammett Award in 2019. In the Best Novel category, Berney received the Macavity and Anthony Awards in 2019. At the Barry Awards, Berney won the 2019 Best Mystery/Crime Novel category and was nominated for the Best Mystery/Crime Novel of the Decade award in 2020. In awards held by the Crime Writer's Association during 2020, November Road was a Gold Dagger nominee and won the CWA Ian Fleming Steel Dagger.

References

1964 births
American crime fiction writers
Screenwriters from Oklahoma
Anthony Award winners
Barry Award winners
Edgar Award winners
Macavity Award winners
Living people